Roberto Maytín and Fernando Romboli were the defending champions but chose not to defend their title.

André Göransson and Marc-Andrea Hüsler won the title after defeating Gonzalo Escobar and Luis David Martínez 6–3, 3–6, [11–9] in the final.

Seeds

Draw

References
 Main draw

Morelos Open - Doubles
2019 Doubles